Events in the year 2020 in Switzerland.

Incumbents
President of the Swiss Confederation: Simonetta Sommaruga
President of the National Council: Isabelle Moret
President of the Swiss Council of States: Hans Stöckli

Events

9 February – Scheduled date for the first voting in the 2020 Swiss referendums  

1 to 2 February – Scheduled date for the 2020 UCI Cyclo-cross World Championships, to be held in Dübendorf
28 April to 3 May – Scheduled date for the road cycling stage race 2020 Tour de Romandie, to be held in Switzerland
25 August 2020 – Raphaël Domjan jumps out of the SolarStratos HB-SXA solar plane in Payerne, Switzerland, with test pilot Miguel Iturmendi in command of the plane, the first jump off of an electric plane and the first free fall in solar history. He dropped several hundred meters and reached a speed of 150kmh.

Deaths

1 January – Martin Bundi, historian and politician (b. 1932).

7 January – Fritz Hans Schweingruber, dendrochronologist (b. 1936). 

19 January – Urs Egger, film director (b. 1953).

24 January – Aenne Goldschmidt, expressionist dancer and choreographer (b. 1920)

References

 
2020s in Switzerland
Years of the 21st century in Switzerland
Switzerland
Switzerland